Jonas Håkansson (born January 4, 1974) is a former Swedish professional ice hockey player who played in the Swedish Hockey League (SHL). Håkansson was drafted in the ninth round of the 1992 NHL Entry Draft by the Philadelphia Flyers, but he never played professionally in North America. He spent his entire professional career in Sweden, playing parts of two seasons in the SHL with the Malmö Redhawks.

References

External links

1974 births
Living people
Malmö Redhawks players
Philadelphia Flyers draft picks
Sportspeople from Malmö
Swedish ice hockey right wingers
Tyringe SoSS players